Middleport is a borough in Schuylkill County, Pennsylvania, United States. The population was 363 at the time of the 2020 census.

The town was named for being the mid-point of the sixteen-mile distance between Pottsville and Tamaqua.

Geography
Middleport is located at  (40.727464, -76.085565).

Demographics

As of the census of 2000, there were 458 people, 196 households, and 121 families living in the borough.

The population density was 1,065.4 people per square mile (411.2/km2). There were 245 housing units at an average density of 569.9 per square mile (220.0/km2).

The racial makeup of the borough was 99.56% White, 0.22% Native American, 0.22% from other races. Hispanic or Latino of any race were 0.22% of the population.

Of the 196 households 25.0% had children under the age of eighteen living with them, 47.4% were married couples living together, 10.7% had a female householder with no husband present, and 37.8% were non-families. 34.2% of households were one person and 20.9% were one person aged sixty-five or older.

The average household size was 2.34 and the average family size was 3.04.

The age distribution was 22.1% under the age of eighteen, 6.3% from eighteen to twenty-four, 28.2% from twenty-five to forty-four, 20.1% from forty-five to sixty-four, and 23.4% who were sixty-five or older. The median age was forty years.

For every one hundred females there were 94.9 males. For every one hundred females who were aged eighteen and over, there were 93.0 males.

The median household income was $30,114 and the median family income  was $34,688. Males had a median income of $30,333 compared with that of $18,750 for females.

The per capita income for the borough was $13,931.

Roughly 10.3% of families and 9.5% of the population were living below the poverty line, including 12.4% of those who were under the age of eighteen and 12.2% of those who were aged sixty-five or over.

Gallery

References

Populated places established in 1829
Boroughs in Schuylkill County, Pennsylvania
1829 establishments in Pennsylvania